Liliane Tanguy (born 12 March 1967) is a French politician of La République En Marche! (LREM) who has been serving as a member of the French National Assembly since the 2017 elections, representing the department of Finistère.

Early life and career
Tanguy was born in Pančevo, Yugoslavia on 12 March 1967 from a Macedonian father and a Croatian mother who emigrated to France.

Political career
In parliament, Tanguy serves as member of the Committee on Foreign Affairs and the Committee on European Affairs.

In addition to her committee assignments, Tanguy is a member of the French parliamentary friendship groups with Croatia, Bosnia and Herzegovina, North Macedonia and Serbia. Since 2019, she has also been a member of the French delegation to the Franco-German Parliamentary Assembly. She has also been a member of the French delegation to the Parliamentary Assembly of the Council of Europe (PACE) since 2019, where she has served on the Sub-Committee on Disability, Multiple and Intersectional Discrimination (since 2020) and the Committee on the Honouring of Obligations and Commitments by Member States of the Council of Europe (Monitoring Committee) (since 2022). 

In 2020, Tanguy joined a En commun (EC), a group within LREM led by Barbara Pompili.

Political positions
In July 2019, Tanguy voted in favor of the French ratification of the European Union’s Comprehensive Economic and Trade Agreement (CETA) with Canada.

Recognition
In 2018 the World Macedonian Congress (WMC) awarded Tanguy with the highest worldwide Macedonian recognition, the honorary title Macedonian senator.

See also
 2017 French legislative election

References

1967 births
Living people
Deputies of the 15th National Assembly of the French Fifth Republic
La République En Marche! politicians
21st-century French women politicians
Place of birth missing (living people)
Women members of the National Assembly (France)
French people of Macedonian descent
French people of Croatian descent
Politicians from Pančevo
Deputies of the 16th National Assembly of the French Fifth Republic